Valeriya Sergeevna Kozlova (Russian: Валерия Сергеевна Козлова; (born 22 January 1988), better known as Lera Kozlova, is a Russian musician most famous for her work with the pop-rock band Ranetki where she provided the vocals and played the drums (from 2005 to 2008). She is also the former vocalist of the band 5sta Family (from 2015 to 2017).

Early life
Was born in Moscow. At 12 years old, she studied at the "Pinocchio" children's ensemble, where she learned to sing and play percussion instruments.

Life and career

"Ranetki Girls" (2005–2008) 
In 2005–2008 she was the vocalist and drummer of the band "Ranetki", and also starred in the television series of the same name produced by the STS channel. The band participated in the tv-shows "Make kids" on MTV and "5 stars" on Channel One.

In 2006, the group recorded the first album "Ranetki" ("Ранетки") (Label "Megaliner Records"). In the same year she took part in the recording of the album "Lords of the Universe" ("Властелины Вселенной") of the Moscow punk rock band "Tarakany!" ("Тараканы!"). In 2008 participated in the recording of singles for the second album "Our Time Has Come" ("Пришло наше время").

According to the results of 2008, she received the People's Prize of Ukraine in the nomination "Discovery of the Year".

1 November 2008 Lera gave the last concert as part of the band "Ranetki", which is in the Luzhniki Palace of Sports. 2 November 2008 it was revealed that Lera had left "Ranetki", under pressure of former boyfriend, producer Sergey Milnichenko.

Solo career: "LeRa", "LERALERA" (2009–2011) 

In 2009, she began a solo career under the pseudonym "LeRa" ("ЛеРа"). Gela Romanovsky became her producer. The first LeRa recital took place on 20 February 2009 in Samara (Russia). In the fall, the premiere of the debut album was expected which has been given the tentative title "My Summer Rain" ("Мой Летний Дождь"), but the release never took place.

At the end of 2009, she took up the solo project "LERALERA" under the production of Yuri Bardash (label "KRUZHEVA Music"). In the same year, Lera starred in the video of the band Quest Pistols for the song "He Is Near" ("Он Рядом"). In 2010, clips were released for the songs "She-Wolf" ("Волчица"), "Unpleasant" ("Неприятно"), "Safe Sex" ("Безопасный Секс").

In June 2010, a new debut album entitled "Give Me A Sign" ("Дай Мне Знак") was released. The album was released on 7 July 2010 in Ukraine. The album was released in Russia in December 2010. In the same year, the release of the game "LERALERA. Beginner's Star School" ("LERALERA. Школа начинающей звезды").

In 2010, after season 5, Lera left the series "Ranetki". In July 2011, together with the bands "Nerves" and "Khaki" ("Хаки") went on a joint tour "Summer, swim trunks, rock 'n' roll!" ("Лето, плавки, рок-н-ролл!").

In 2011, at the "OOPS" magazine party, Lera announced the closure of the "LERALERA" project and her departure from the scene.

"5sta Family" (2015–2017) 

On 23 May 2015, members of the band "5sta Family" reported that Lera became the new vocalist instead of Yulianna Karaulova. On 8 July, the single "Aptly" ("Метко") was released, which became a presentation for Lera in the band.

21 January 2016 released the second single "Erasing the Borders" ("Стирая границы").

On 6 May 2016, the single "5sta Family" "T-shirt" ("Футболка") was released, and on 24 May a clip.

On 24 January 2017, the single "5sta Family" "Vesuvius" ("Везувий") was released.

On 30 April, the single and clip "5sta Family" "High-Rises" ("Многоэтажки") was released.

On 5 November, on her Instagram, Valeria announced that on 2 December in Nizhny Novgorod, the last concert with her participation as part of the band "5sta Family" will be held.

"KURAGA" (2017–2019) 

In May 2017, former members of the band "Ranetki" created the YouTube channel KURAGA, dedicated to their life after the end of the group. In parallel with this, the girls began work on the reunion of the band (consisting of Kozlova, Tretyakova, Ogurtsova, Baydavletova, Rudneva). Later, the latter refused to participate in the reunion. The project also began to have problems due to threats from the former producer of the band "Ranetki" Sergey Milnichenko.

On 29 June 2019, Lera performed at the festival "Generation NEXT" as part of the ex-"Ranetki".

"NYUTA&LERA" (2019–present) 

On 8 November 2019, Lera announced the creation of a musical duet called "NYUTA&LERA" together with Anna "Nyuta" Baydavletova under the label "Warner Music Russia". On 14 February 2020, the first song "My Boy" was premiered.

Discography

Studio albums 
 Ranetki (Ранетки) (2006) – Ranetki Girls
 Give Me a Sign (Дай Мне Знак) (2010) – LERALERA

Backing vocal 
 Lords of the Universe (Властелины Вселенной) (2006) – Tarakany!

Songs

Music videos

Filmography

References 
 On some sites the last name of actress is indicated as Vodnikova. However, on confession of actress, it did not change the last name is simply error, which is often circulated in the internet at pointing of list of actors, playing in a serial.

External links 
 

1988 births
Living people
Russian pop singers
Singers from Moscow
21st-century Russian singers
21st-century Russian women singers